Vexillum virginale is a species of small sea snail, marine gastropod mollusk in the family Costellariidae, the ribbed miters.

Description

Distribution

References

virginale
Gastropods described in 1842
Taxa named by René Lesson